Kampamba Mulenga Chilumba (born 3 March 1976) is a Zambian politician and a member of the Patriotic Front. In 2016 and 2018, she served as the Minister of Information and Broadcasting and the minister of Fisheries and Livestock respectively. She is currently the member of parliament for Kalulushi constituency and was the Minister for Community Development and Social Welfare.

Education 
She holds Advanced Certificate in Health Care and Advanced Certificate in IT.

Career 
Kampamba Chilumba worked as a nurse after training in health care and information technology. She was elected for the election on 11 August 2016 as a candidate of the Patriotic Front (PF) for the first time a member of the National Assembly of Zambia and represents the constituency of Kalulushi . Between October and November 2016, she was a member of the Estimate Committee of the National Assembly. In November 2016, she was appointed by President Edgar Lungu as Minister of Information and Broadcasting Services in his Cabinet.

Personal life 
She is married to Kizito Chewe.

References

Living people
1976 births
Zambian politicians